WVOX (1460 AM) is a radio station licensed to New Rochelle, New York. The station is operated as a regional community station in suburban Westchester County, the Bronx, Queens, the North Shore of Nassau County, Fairfield County, Connecticut, and northern New Jersey. The current owner is Hudson-Westchester Radio, Inc. along with WVIP 93.5 FM. The station claimed more than five million live listeners as of 2005. Its studios and transmitter are located separately in New Rochelle.

WVOX reaches many more listeners worldwide by streaming live online. As of July 12, 2010, WVOX can also be heard on the HD2 subchannel of its FM sister station, WVIP.

Programming is primarily locally produced information and talk, including programs presented by local citizens and interest groups. The station is affiliated with Music of Your Life, which airs overnights, weekends, and in time slots not occupied by a local show.

History

Early years
On April 28, 1949, New Rochelle Broadcasting Service, Inc. filed for a construction permit to build a new radio station at 1460 kHz in New Rochelle. The permit was granted on June 22, 1950, and WGNR began broadcasting on September 9, 1950. WGNR-FM 93.5 had already launched in September 1948.

New Rochelle Broadcasting Service, however, went bankrupt in 1952, signing the station off on August 1; after the appointment of a receiver, Radio New Rochelle, Inc., owned by the Iodice Family, acquired the station and changed the call letters to WNRC on both the AM and FM stations. WNRC returned to the air in October 1953; it retained those call letters through a transfer of control to the Daniels family in 1955. 

WNRC became WWES-AM-FM on December 10, 1958, as the station was sold to Radio Westchester for $225,000. The Radio Westchester sale made it a sister to WVIP in Mount Kisco, serving lower Westchester County. On February 26, 1959, however, the station would adopt the calls it has used ever since: WVOX.

WVOX
WVOX joined a growing radio operation owned by the New York Herald-Tribune newspaper. By 1962, after John Hay Whitney bought the Herald-Tribune the year before, the paper's radio division included WVOX-AM-FM, WVIP, WGHQ at Saugerties and WFYI in Mineola. With the Herald-Tribune closed, Whitney Communications sold WVOX-AM-FM and WGHQ-AM-FM in 1968 to Hudson-Westchester Radio in an $800,000 acquisition. Hudson-Westchester was led by William O'Shaughnessy, a former account executive with the Herald-Tribune Radio Network who had been WVOX's general manager since 1965.

O'Shaughnessy built WVOX into a community-oriented talk outlet, which by 1973 already had the reputation of being the "soap box of Westchester". That year, it moved out of its former studios, which he called an "upholstered sewer", to new facilities at One Broadcast Plaza in New Rochelle. O'Shaughnessy hosted a daily talk show on the station for more than 50 years, featuring interviews with many major U.S. politicians, authors, and entertainers. O'Shaughnessy, who has been called "the voice of Westchester", is fond of calling WVOX the "quintessential community radio station in America", a label first applied to the station by the Wall Street Journal. In 2005, O'Shaughnessy was one of the first 25 people to be inducted into the new New York State Broadcasters Hall of Fame by the New York State Broadcasters Association. He was honored for his long record as a champion of free speech under the First Amendment. 

WVOX's programming in the 1970s included local news roundup shows dedicated to towns in its coverage area, such as Mount Vernon and Pelham; the call-in show "Open Line", which often ran over its allotted time slot; ethnic and religious blocks; and standards music when the station didn't have a talk show on the air.

Following his departure from WEVD in 2001, Bill Mazer launched an afternoon interview program on WVOX, which aired from 3–6 PM ET (and streamed from WVOX's website), with his son Arnie serving as producer. Mazer's last show was aired August 3, 2009, ending his tenure at the station and marking his retirement from broadcasting.

William O'Shaughnessy died May 28, 2022, at age 84.

See also
List of community radio stations in the United States

References

External links
 WVOX website

Mass media in New Rochelle, New York
VOX
Community radio stations in the United States